Abraham Phineas 'Pinky' Danilowitz, was a South African international bowls player who won a gold medal at the Commonwealth Games.

Bowls career
At the 1958 British Empire and Commonwealth Games he won the gold medal in the singles event.

He also won the 1957 singles at the National Championships bowling for the Kadimah Krugersdorp Bowls Club.

Personal life
He was a Timber Merchant by trade.

References

South African male bowls players
Bowls players at the 1958 British Empire and Commonwealth Games
Commonwealth Games gold medallists for South Africa
Commonwealth Games medallists in lawn bowls
1908 births
Year of death missing
Medallists at the 1958 British Empire and Commonwealth Games